Amer Naow (born 1 January 1995) is a Syrian tennis player.

Naow represents Syria at the Davis Cup, where he has a W/L record of 8–8.

Due to the Syrian Civil War, Naow was forced out of Aleppo and moved to Beirut, Lebanon, but now plays tennis for local leagues in Germany. Through this, he received a wildcard to the qualifying rounds of the 2017 Marburg Open, a Challenger-level tournament.

References

External links
 
 
 

1995 births
Living people
Syrian male tennis players
Sportspeople from Aleppo